The Şişli Armenian Cemetery is an Armenian cemetery  in the Şişli district of Istanbul, Turkey which is operated and served by the Armenian community of Turkey.

Notable burials 
 Hovhannes Arsharouni – Armenian Patriarch of Constantinople
 Simon Agopyan – Painter
 Zabel Sibil Asadour – Writer
 Sevag Balıkçı – murdered conscript in Turkish Military
 Zaven Biberyan – Writer
 Hagop Dilacar – Linguist
 Markar Esayan – Journalist and Politician
 Mari Gerekmezyan – Sculptor
 Harutyun Hanesyan – Musician
 Udi Hrant – Musician
 Garbis İstanbulluoğlu – Football Athlete
 Toto Karaca – Actress
 Sirvart Karamanuk – Composer and Pianist
 Arman Manukyan – Professor
 Matild Manukyan – Businesswoman
 Malachia Ormanian – Armenian Patriarch of Constantinople
 Stepan Papelyan – Musician
 Maryam Şahinyan – Photographer
 Nubar Terziyan – Actor
 Onno Tunc – Musician and Composer
 Yervant Voskan – Sculptor
 Zahrad – Poet
 Haykanush Mark – Writer, poet
 Anahit Yulanda Varan – female street performer playing the accordion
 Garbis Zakaryan – Boxer

References

External links
 

Armenian cemeteries
Armenians from the Ottoman Empire
Armenians in Istanbul
Cemeteries in Istanbul
Eastern Orthodox cemeteries
Şişli